A spare wheel cover or spare tire cover is an accessory that covers the spare wheel mounted on external part of a car or van. On 4x4 vehicles the spare wheel is normally rear mounted and is often printed with a dealer's name or something more fun. Covers can be hard shells or soft vinyl covers. Spare wheel cover protects spare tires from the dirt and the sun's harmful UV rays in areas with many days of sunshine.  Spare wheel covers need to be removed once in a while and cleaned.

Photo gallery

References

Automotive accessories